Vadim Kharchenko (Russian: Вадим Харченко; born 28 May 1985), is a Kyrgyzstani footballer, who is a midfielder of Alga Bishkek. He is a member of the Kyrgyzstan national football team. In 2006, he was named Midfielder of the Year in Kyrgyzstan.

Career statistics

International

Statistics accurate as of match played 3 September 2015

International goals
Score and Result lists Kyrgyzstan goals first

Honours
Dordoi Bishkek
Kyrgyzstan League (7): 2006, 2007, 2008, 2009, 2011, 2012, 2014
Kyrgyzstan Cup (5): 2003, 2006, 2008, 2010, 2012
AFC President's Cup (1): 2006, 2007

References

External links
Player profile – doha-2006.com

1984 births
Living people
Kyrgyzstani footballers
Kyrgyzstan international footballers
Kyrgyzstani expatriate footballers
FC Dordoi Bishkek players
Kyrgyzstani people of Russian descent
TKİ Tavşanlı Linyitspor footballers
TFF First League players
Kyrgyzstani emigrants to Russia
Footballers at the 2006 Asian Games
Association football midfielders
Asian Games competitors for Kyrgyzstan